The Canning Season is a young adult novel by American-Canadian author Polly Horvath. It was first published in 2003 by Farrar, Straus and Giroux.

Awards and honors
2003 National Book Award for Young People's Literature
2004 American Library Association Young Adult Canadian Book of the Year
A 2003 Horn Book Fanfare Best Book of the Year for Fiction
A Kirkus Reviews Editor's Choice and Starred Review
A 2004 American Library Association Best Book for Young Adults
A 2003 Publishers Weekly Best Book of the Year in Fiction
A 2003 School Library Journal Best Book of the Year
A Chicago Tribune Best Book of 2003
A Washington Post Best Book of 2003

References

2003 American novels
American young adult novels

Novels by Polly Horvath
Farrar, Straus and Giroux books